Hyderabad Tehsil (rural) is an administrative subdivision (tehsil) of Hyderabad District in the Sindh province of Pakistan. Hyderabad district is subdivided into 4 talukas, the Urban area around the capital Hyderabad is part of Hyderabad City Taluka.

Administration
The rural Taluka of Hyderabad  is administratively subdivided into 20 Union Councils, these are:

References

Populated places in Hyderabad District, Pakistan
Talukas of Sindh